was a Japanese cyclist. He competed in the individual road race at the 1964 Summer Olympics. He became the director of the Shimano Racing team but died in the crash of Japan Airlines Flight 123 at age 39.

References

External links
 

1946 births
1985 deaths
Japanese male cyclists
Olympic cyclists of Japan
Cyclists at the 1964 Summer Olympics
Place of birth missing
Asian Games medalists in cycling
Cyclists at the 1966 Asian Games
Medalists at the 1966 Asian Games
Asian Games gold medalists for Japan
Victims of aviation accidents or incidents in Japan
Victims of aviation accidents or incidents in 1985